Aplosonyx nigricollis is a species of beetle belonging to the family Chrysomelidae. It can be found in Malay Peninsula and in Indonesia (Nias, Mentawai Islands, Batu Islands).

References
Synopsis of the described Chrysomelidae of the world
Chrysomelidae Galerucinae at Sciences Naturelles
Kimoto, Shinsaku -  Chrysomelidae (Coleoptera) of Thailand, Cambodia, Laos and Vietnam
Christopher Taylor Variety of Life

Galerucinae
Insects of Indonesia
Beetles described in 1885